Dasher may refer to any of the following:
 Dasher (software), a computer accessibility tool
 Dasher (Santa Claus's reindeer), one of Santa Claus's reindeer as named in "The Night Before Christmas"
 Dasher, Georgia, a town in the United States
 Volkswagen Dasher or Passat, an automobile model
 HMS Dasher (1895), a Charger-class torpedo-boat destroyer launched in 1895 and sold in 1912
 HMS Dasher (D37), an Avenger-class escort carrier launched in 1941 and sunk in 1943
 HMS Dasher (P280), an Archer-class patrol boat launched in 1986 and currently in service
 Danville Dashers, a former ice hockey team from Danville, Illinois, in the Continental Hockey League
 Danville Dashers, an ice hockey team from Danville, Illinois, in the Federal Hockey League
 Dasher High School, a historic institution of secondary education in Valdosta, Georgia
 Frank Abbandando or The Dasher, a New York contract killer
 Dasher Troy, American baseball player
 Kevin Wheatley or Dasher, Australian recipient of the Victoria Cross
 Dasher, the plunger part of a butter churn

People with the surname
 Erica Dasher, American actress

See also
 Blue dasher (Pachydiplax longipennis), a dragonfly indigenous to North America
HMS Dasher, a list of ships named HMS Dasher